William C. Bryan (September 9, 1852 – March 27, 1933) was a United States Army soldier who received the Medal of Honor. His award came for gallantry during the American Indian Wars.

Biography
Bryan was born on September 9, 1852, in Zanesville, Ohio. He enlisted into the United States Army at St. Louis in 1874, and was made a Hospital Steward. Bryan was assigned to the Department of the Platte, commanded by Brigadier General George Crook. In February 1876 he was attached to the Medical Company of the Big Horn Expedition under the direction of Assistant Surgeon Curtis E. Munn.

Bryan accompanied the expedition into Montana Territory during March 1876. On the seventeenth, he was riding with Company K of the 2nd United States Cavalry when the troop was ordered by Colonel Joseph J. Reynolds to charge and capture an encampment of Northern Cheyenne and Lakota Sioux. In the opening actions of the Battle of Powder River, Bryan's horse was killed under him. He continued to fight on foot, carrying two wounded soldiers to safety, inevitably saving them from capture. For these actions, Hospital Steward William C. Bryan was awarded the Medal of Honor in 1899.

Bryan was later promoted to the rank of captain and retired from the Army in 1901. He married Lucy B. Wetzel (1873-1945). Captain William C. Bryan died on March 27, 1933, in Santa Monica, California. He was buried in Fairmount Cemetery in Denver, Colorado.

Medal of Honor citation
Rank and organization: Hospital Steward, Medical Company. Place and date: At Powder River, Montana, March 17, 1876. Entered service at: St. Louis, Missouri, United States. Born: September 9, 1852, Zanesville, Ohio. Date of issue: June 15, 1899.

Citation:

"Hospital Steward Bryan accompanied a detachment of cavalry in a charge on a village of hostile Indians and fought through the engagements, having his horse killed under him. He continued to fight on foot, and under severe fire and without assistance conveyed two wounded comrades to places of safety, saving them from capture."

See also 
 Battle of Powder River

References

External links
 
 Medal of Honor Recipients: Indian Wars Period

1852 births
1933 deaths
American Indian Wars recipients of the Medal of Honor
American military personnel of the Indian Wars
Burials in Colorado
People from Zanesville, Ohio
Military personnel from Ohio
United States Army Medal of Honor recipients
United States Army officers